Petrus "Piet" Adrianus Wernink (1 April 1895 in Oudshoorn – 29 November 1971, Wassenaar) was a sailor from the Netherlands, who represented his native country at the 1920 Summer Olympics in Ostend, Belgium. With helmsman Joop Carp and fellow crew member Berend Carp, sailing the Dutch boat Oranje, Wernink took the Gold in the 6.5 Metre.

References

Sources

External links
 
 

1895 births
1971 deaths
Sportspeople from Alphen aan den Rijn
Dutch male sailors (sport)
Sailors at the 1920 Summer Olympics – 6.5 Metre
Olympic sailors of the Netherlands
Medalists at the 1920 Summer Olympics
Olympic medalists in sailing
Olympic gold medalists for the Netherlands